Utyaganovo (Ütägän) is a rural locality (a selo) in Novokiyeshkinsky Selsoviet, Karmaskalinsky District, Bashkortostan, Russia. The population was 438 as of 2010. There are 6 streets.

Geography 
Utyaganovo is located 32 km east of Karmaskaly (the district's administrative centre) by road. Novye Kiyeshki is the nearest rural locality.

References 

Rural localities in Karmaskalinsky District